The 1932–33 New York Americans season was the Americans' eighth season of play. The Americans again did not qualify for the playoffs. This was the fourth-straight season that they missed the playoffs and the seventh time out of eight seasons.

Offseason

Regular season

Final standings

Record vs. opponents

Game log

Playoffs
They didn't qualify for the playoffs

Player stats

Regular season
Scoring

Goaltending

Awards and records

Transactions

See also
1932–33 NHL season

References

New York Americans seasons
New York Americans
New York Americans
New York Amer
New York Amer
1930s in Manhattan
Madison Square Garden